Nikolai Borisovich Kulikov (Russian: Куликов, Николай Борисович; April 25, 1953 in Moscow, USSR – August 11, 1979 in Dniprodzerzhynsk, Ukraine SSR) was a Soviet footballer. Kulikov played for FC Pakhtakor Tashkent as a defender from 1976 to 1979, before he died in a mid-air plane crash in August 1979. He was classified as a Master of Sport of the USSR in 1979.

Early life and career
A product of FC Dynamo Moscow's youth football system; Kulikov's first coaches were the famous Soviet football players Vladimir Kesarev and Sergey Solovyov. In 1974 Nikolai Kulikov, a young half-back, was invited to FC Khanki (Khorezm, Uzbek SSR) where he played for two seasons. In 1976 Nikolai Kulikov successfully played for FK Yangiyer (Yangier, Uzbek SSR) and was recruited by FC Pakhtakor Tashkent (Tashkent, Uzbek SSR). In 1977 FC Pakhtakor was promoted from the Soviet First League to the Soviet Top League. Nikolai Kulikov invaluably contributed to FC Pakhtakor success with twenty-one matches in defence and one goal. He was highly praised for high mobility, good play thinking, and reciprocity and sincere friendship with teammates.

Death
At 26, Kulikov and sixteen other FC Pakhtakor players and staff died in a mid-air collision over Kurilovka (Dneprodzerzhinsk, Ukrainian SSR). Buried in his patrimony Krivskoye (near Obninsk, Borovskiy District, Kaluga Oblast, Russia).

References

1953 births
1979 deaths
Soviet footballers
Pakhtakor Tashkent FK players
Victims of aviation accidents or incidents in the Soviet Union
Victims of aviation accidents or incidents in Ukraine
Association footballers not categorized by position